The International Academy of Medical and Biological Engineering (IAMBE) is a non-profit society of distinguished scholars engaged in medical and biological engineering research to further the field of biomedical engineering or bioengineering. The academy is composed of Fellows who have made significant contributions to and played leadership roles in the field of medical and biological engineering. The academy is affiliated with the International Federation for Medical and Biological Engineering (IFMBE), an international organization consisting of more than 60 national and transnational societies of biomedical engineering, representing over 120,000 members.

The academy was established by International Federation for Medical and Biological Engineering in 1997 to honor individuals who have contributed significantly to the theory and practice of medical and biological engineering, and made extraordinary leadership efforts in promoting the field of medical and biological engineering.

The academy has engaged in public debates in identifying grand challenges in engineering life sciences, and played an advisory role to the leadership of International Federation for Medical and Biological Engineering. A recent conference endorsed by the academy is IEEE Life Sciences Grand Challenges Conference, which consists of distinguished speakers including Nobel Laureate, National Medal of Sciences Laureate, National Medal of Technology Laureate, president of National Academy of Engineering, director of National Institute of Biomedical Imaging and Bioengineering of NIH, and chair of the International Academy of Medical and Biological Engineering.

Fellow nominations are accepted either annually or every three years. Fellows may be nominated by a fellow of the academy or by International Federation for Medical and Biological Engineering. The nominations are screened by the Membership Committee of the academy. Election to Fellow status is subject to a vote by all current Fellows.

The founding chair of the academy is Robert Nerem, Parker H. Petit Distinguished Chair for Engineering in Medicine and Institute Professor at the Georgia Institute of Technology. The immediate Past Chair of the academy is Niilo Saranummi, Research Professor at VTT Technical Research Centre of Finland and Past President of International Federation for Medical and Biological Engineering. The current chair of the academy is Roger Kamm, Cecil and Ida Green Professor of Biological and Mechanical Engineering at the Massachusetts Institute of Technology.

List of fellows
 Metin Akay, '12, University of Houston, USA
 Joji Ando, '09, Dokkyo Medical University, Japan
 Lars Arendt-Nielsen, '03, Aalborg University, Denmark
 Kazuhiko Atsumi, FF, FE, University of Tokyo, Japan
 Albert Avolio, '12, Macquarie University, Australia
 Jing Bai, '12, Tsinghua University, China
 James Bassingthwaighte, '09, University of Washington, USA
 Rebecca Bergman, '12, Medtronic, USA
 Marcello Bracale, '03, University of Naples Federico II, Italy
 Per-Ingvar Branemark, '00, University of Gothenburg, Sweden
 Colin Caro, '00, Imperial College London, UK
 Ewart Carson, '06, City University London, UK
 Sergio Cerutti, '03, Polytechnic University in Milan (Politecnico), Italy
 Walter H. Chang, '06, Chung Yuan Christian University, Taiwan
 Shu Chien, '00, University of California San Diego, USA
 Jean-Louis Coatrieux, '02, University of Rennes 1, France
 Richard S. C. Cobbold, FF, University of Toronto, Canada
 Paolo Dario, '03, Sant'Anna School of Advanced Studies of Pisa, Italy
 Ivan Daskalov, '03 (Deceased), Bulgarian Academy of Sciences, Bulgaria
 David Delpy, '03, Engineering and Physical Sciences Research Council (EPSRC), UK
 Jacques Demongeot, '12, University Joseph Fourier, France
 André Dittmar, '12, Centre national de la recherche scientifique (CNRS), France
 Takeyoshi Dohi, '06, University of Tokyo, Japan
 Olaf Doessel, '12, Karlsruhe Institute of Technology, Germany
 Floyd Dunn, FF, FE, University of Illinois at Urbana-Champaign, USA
 Shmuel Einav, '05, Tel Aviv University, Israel
 Ross Ethier, '09, Imperial College London, UK
 Uwe Faust, FF, FE, University of Stuttgart, Germany
 Leszek Filipczynski, FF, FE (Deceased), Polish Academy of Sciences, Poland
 Yuan-Cheng B. Fung, FF, FE, University of California San Diego, USA
 Leslie Alexander Geddes, FF (Deceased), University of Toronto, Canada
 Amit Gefen, '14, Tel Aviv University, Israel
 Morteza Gharib, '12, California Institute of Technology, USA
 Bin He, '12, University of Minnesota, USA
 Hiie Hinrikus, '03, Tallinn University of Technology, Estonia
 Nozomu Hoshimiya, '06, Tohoku Gakuin University, Japan
 Peter Hunter, '03, University of Auckland, New Zealand
 Helmut Hutten, '03, Graz University of Technology, Austria
 Dov Jaron, '06, Drexel University, USA
 Fumihiko Kajiya, '00, Kawasaki University of Medical Welfare, Japan
 Akira Kamiya, '02, Nihon University, Japan
 Roger D. Kamm, '06, Massachusetts Institute of Technology, USA
 Hiroshi Kanai, FF, FE, Tohoku University, Japan
 Zhenhuang Kang, FF, Chengdu University of Science and Technology, China
 Toivo Katila, '03, Helsinki University central Hospital, Finland
 Richard E. Kerber, '09, University of Iowa, USA
 Makoto Kikuchi, '12, National Defence Medical College, Japan
 Yongmin Kim, '09, Pohang University of Science and Technology, South Korea
 Richard Kitney, '03, Imperial College London, UK
 Peter Kneppo, '03, Czech Technical University, Czech Republic
 Pablo Laguna, '12, University of Zaragoza, Spain
 Daniel Laurent, FF, FE, Universite Marne-La-Vallee, France
 Raphael Lee, '12, University of Chicago, USA
 Peter Lewin, '12, Drexel University, USA
 Pai-Chi Li, '09, National Taiwan University, Taiwan
 Zhi-Pei Liang, '12, University of Illinois at Urbana-Champaign, USA
 John H. Linehan, '06, Northwestern University, USA
 Jaakko Malmivuo, '03, Tampere University of Technology, Finland
 Roman Maniewski, '03, Polish Academy of Sciences, Poland
 Andrew McCulloch, '05, University of California San Diego, USA
 Jean-Pierre Morucci, FE, National Institute of Health and Medical Research, France
 Joachim Nagel, '12, University of Stuttgart, Germany
 Maciej Nalecz, FF, FE (Deceased), Polish Academy of Sciences, Poland
 Robert M. Nerem, FF, Georgia Institute of Technology, USA
 Peter Niederer, '00, ETH Zurich, Switzerland
 Benno M. Nigg, '00, University of Calgary, Canada
 Marc Nyssen, '12, Free University Brussels, Belgium
 P. Ake Oberg, FF, Linkoping University, Sweden
 Kazuo Ogino, '12, Nihon Kohden Corporation, Japan
 Nicolas Pallikarakis, '05, University of Patras, Greece
 John P Paul, FF, FE, University of Strathclyde, UK
 Antonio Pedotti, '00, Politecnico di Milano, Italy
 Robert Plonsey, FF, FE, Duke University, USA
 Leandre Pourcelot, '00, Francois Rabelais University, France
 Jose Principe, '12, University of Florida, USA
 Basil Proimos, FE, University of Patras, Greece
 Buddy D. Ratner, '00, University of Washington, USA
 Gunter Rau, FF, RWTH Aachen University, Germany
 Robert S Reneman, '03, Maastricht University, Netherlands
 James B. Reswick, FF, FE, U.S. Department of Education, USA
 Nandor Richter, FF, FE, National Institute for Hospital and Medical Engineering, Hungary
 Laura Roa, '03, University of Seville, Spain
 Fernand A Roberge, FF, University of Montreal, Canada
 Colin Roberts, '02, King's College London, UK
 Peter Rolfe, FF, Oxford BioHorizons Ltd., UK, and Harbin Institute of Technology, China
 Annelise Rosenfalck, FF (Deceased), Aalborg University, Denmark
 Christian Roux, '03, Télécom Bretagne, France
 Masao Saito, FF, Tokyo Denki University, Japan
 Niilo Saranummi, '00, VTT Technical Research Center, Finland
 Shunske Sato, '03, Osaka University, Japan
 Klaus Schindhelm, 'FF, University of New South Wales, Australia
 Geert W. Schmid-Schoenbe, '05, University of California San Diego, USA
 Leif Sornmo, '12, Lund University, Sweden
 Jos AE Spaan, '09, University of Amsterdam, Netherlands
 Kazuo Tanishita, '09, Keio University
 Nitish Thakor, '12, Johns Hopkins School of Medicine, USA
 Jie Tian, '12, Chinese Academy of Sciences, China
 Tatsuo Togawa, FF, Waseda University, Japan
 Shoogo Ueno, '06, University of Tokyo, Japan
 Max E. Valentinuzzi, FF, FE, University of Buenos Aires, Argentina
 Christopher L. 'Kit' Vaughan, '05, University of Cape Town, South Africa
 Karin Wardell, '12, Linkoping University, Sweden
 Peter Wells, FF, FE, Cardiff University, UK
 Andrzej Werynski, '03, Institute of Biocybernetics and Biomedical Engineering, Poland
 Nico Westerhof, FE, VU University, Netherlands
 Erich Wintermantel, '03, Swiss Federal Institute of Technology Zurich, Switzerland
 Jan Wojcicki, '12, Polish Academy of Sciences, Poland
 Bernhard Wolf, '12, Technische Universitaet Muenchen, Germany
 Zi Bin Yang, '02, Peking Union Medical College, China
 Yuan-Ting Zhang, '06, Chinese University of Hong Kong, Hong Kong

References

Medical physics organizations